Herman Henry Torborg (January 1869 in New York City – November 25, 1938 in Brooklyn, New York City) was an American lawyer and politician from New York.

Life
He was the son of John H. Torborg (c.1829–1913) and Catherine A. Torborg (c.1834–1917). Shortly after Herman's birth the family removed to the Town of New Lots which was annexed to Brooklyn in 1886. He graduated from Browne's Brooklyn Business College.

Torborg was a member of the New York State Assembly (Kings Co., 21st D.) in 1899. He was Cashier of the Bureau for the Collection of Taxes of Brooklyn from 1906 to 1909. He graduated from Brooklyn Law School, and was admitted to the bar in 1912.

He was a member of the New York State Senate (10th D.) in 1913 and 1914.

He was Assistant Corporation Counsel of New York City from 1918 to 1933. He was dismissed by Corporation Counsel Hilly on October 31, 1933, for supporting Joseph V. McKee for Mayor of New York.

Torborg died on November 25, 1938, in Brooklyn.

Sources
 Official New York from Cleveland to Hughes by Charles Elliott Fitch (Hurd Publishing Co., New York and Buffalo, 1911, Vol. IV; pg. 340)
 ADMISSIONS TO THE BAR in NYT on May 9, 1912
 Obituary Notes; Mrs. CATHERINE A. TORBORG in NYT on January 28, 1917
 MAYOR HYLAN'S PERSONAL FRIENDS ... ON THE CITY'S PAYROLL in NYT on April 21, 1918 
 Hilly Ousts 3 Aides for Backing McKee in NYT on November 1, 1933 (subscription required)
 HERMAN H. TORBORG, EX-LEGISLATOR, DIES in NYT on November 27, 1938 (subscription required)

1869 births
1938 deaths
Democratic Party New York (state) state senators
People from Brooklyn
Democratic Party members of the New York State Assembly
Brooklyn Law School alumni